This page list topics related to Oman.



0-9

 1970 Omani coup d'état

A
Aflaj Irrigation Systems of Oman
Agriculture in Oman
Al Alam Palace
Al Saada Sports Complex
Alwatan
Administrative divisions of Oman
Amlah
American British Academy
Archaeology of Oman

B
Bahla Fort
Bahla (football club)
Bait Al Zubair
Batinah Expressway
Battle of Mirbat
British School - Muscat

C
Central Bank of Oman
Christianity in Oman
Communications in Oman
Consultative Assembly of Oman
Copyright law of Oman
Council of State of Oman
Cuisine of Oman
Culture of Oman

D
Demographics of Oman
Dhofar (football club)
Dhofar Rebellion
Dolphin Gas Project

E
Economy of Oman
Education in Oman
Energy in Oman

F
Fahud
Fanja (football club)
Flag of Oman
Foreign relations of Oman
Freedom of religion in Oman

G
Geography of Oman
Geology of Oman
Governorates – see administrative divisions of Oman

H
Health in Oman
Healthcare in Oman
Higher College of Technology
History of Oman
History of the Jews in Oman
Human rights in Oman

I
Indian School Al Ghubra
Indian School Muscat
Indian School Wadi Kabir
Indians in Oman
Islam in Oman

J
Jebel Akhdar (Oman)

K
Al-Khaburah
Khanjar
Khasab Air Base
Khatmat Malaha

L
Land of Frankincense Museum
List of airports in Oman
List of cities in Oman
List of fish on stamps of Oman
List of hospitals in Oman
List of museums in Oman
List of schools in Oman
Luwati language

M
Madha
Majlis as-Shura
Military ranks of Oman
Mintaqah – see administrative divisions of Oman
Mjees
Muhafazah – see administrative divisions of Oman
Musandam
Muscat (football club)
Muscat, Oman
Muscat Expressway
Museum of Omani Heritage
Land of Frankincense Museum
Muscat International Airport
Muscat Securities Market
Muscat and Oman
Music of Oman

N
Al-Nahda (Omani football club)
Nakhal Fort
Al-Nasr (Salalah)
Nashid as-Salaam as-Sultani
National anthem of Oman
National Bank of Oman
National Bank of Oman Golf Classic
National emblem of Oman
National Museum
Nawras

O
Old Muscat
.om
Oman
Oman Air
Oman at the Olympics
Oman Club
Oman Football Association
Oman LNG
Oman national beach handball team
Oman national cricket team
Oman national football team
Oman Natural History Museum
Oman Oil Company
Oman Open
Oman proper
Oman Rail
Oman Refinery Company
Oman TV Satellite
Oman–Zanzibar war
Omani Arabic
Omani Empire
Omani French Museum
Omani League
Omani parliamentary election, 2003
Omani parliamentary election, 2007
Omani rial
Omanis
Omanisation
Omantel
Omran Company
Orders, decorations, and medals of Oman
Al Oruba Sur

P
Petroleum Development Oman
Politics of Oman
Popular Front for the Liberation of Oman
Provinces of Oman
Public holidays in Oman

Q
Qaboos of Oman
Qahir Al Amwaj

R
Regions – see administrative divisions of Oman
Roman Catholicism in Oman
Royal Air Force of Oman
Royal Army of Oman
Royal Guard of Oman
Royal Guard of Oman Technical College
Royal Navy of Oman
Royal Oman Police
Royal Oman Police Stadium
Royal Opera House Muscat

S
Seydi Ali Reis
Samad al-Shan
Salalah Airport
Said bin Taimur
Saif Sareea II
Seeb (football club)
Seeb Stadium
Shaikh Ahmed bin Mohammed al-Khalili
Sultan's Armed Forces Museum
Sultan Qaboos Cup
Sultan Qaboos Grand Mosque
Sultan Qaboos Sports Complex
Sultan Qaboos Street
Sultan Qaboos University
Sultan Qaboos University Library
Sultan of Oman
Sultan of Oman's Armed Forces
Sultan's Special Forces
Sur Club
Sur Sports Complex

T
Talia Club
Telecommunications in Oman
Telephone numbers in Oman
The Sultan's School
Theweek
Timeline of Muscat
Times of Oman
Tourism in Oman
Trade unions in Oman
Transport in Oman
Treaty of Seeb
Trucial Oman Scouts

U
United States-Oman Free Trade Agreement
United Nations Security Council Resolution 299

V
Visa policy of Oman

W
Wajaja
Wildlife of Oman
World Fireworks Championship

X

Y
Yibal

Z

See also

Lists of country-related topics – similar lists for other countries
Outline of Oman

Oman